Jonathan Malen is a Canadian actor, best known for providing the voice for Jimmy Z in Wild Kratts.

Personal life 
Jonathan Malen and actress Lauren Collins became engaged on August 29, 2017. They were married in October 2018. They welcomed their first child, Charlie Sebastian Malen, on March 6, 2020.

Filmography

Film

Television

Animation

Film

References

External links
 

Living people
20th-century Canadian male actors
21st-century Canadian male actors
Canadian male child actors
Canadian male film actors
Canadian male television actors
Canadian male voice actors
Year of birth missing (living people)